Morgane Coston (born 28 December 1990) is a French racing cyclist, who currently rides for UCI Women's Continental Team .

Career
She had signed to ride for the UCI Women's Team  for the 2019 women's road cycling season, but elected to retire that February due to injury. She returned to racing 18 months later, signing for Chambéry CC. In October 2020, it was announced that Coston would return to the professional peloton in 2021, with the  team.

Major results
2021
 1st  Mountains classification Kreiz Breizh Elites Dames
 2nd Overall Tour de Feminin
 9th Road race, National Road Championships

References

External links
 

1990 births
Living people
French female cyclists
Sportspeople from Haute-Savoie
Cyclists from Auvergne-Rhône-Alpes